Arizona Christian School Tuition Organization v. Winn, 563 U.S. 125 (2011), is a decision by the Supreme Court of the United States involving taxpayer standing under Article Three of the United States Constitution.

A group of Arizona taxpayers challenged a state law providing tax credits to people who donate to school tuition organizations providing scholarships to students attending private or religious schools. The taxpayers claimed a violation of the Establishment Clause. The District Court dismissed the case, holding that the taxpayers did not state a valid claim. The decision was reversed by the Ninth Circuit, which ruled that the respondents had standing to sue, citing Flast v. Cohen.

The Supreme Court ruled 5–4, in an opinion delivered by Justice Anthony Kennedy, that the plaintiffs did not have standing to bring suit. The Court stated that it had "rejected the general proposition that an individual who has paid taxes has a 'continuing, legally cognizable interest in ensuring that those funds are not used by the Government in a way that violates the Constitution.'" Ultimately, the Supreme Court found that any damages or harm claimed by the taxpayers by virtue of simply being a taxpayer would be pure speculation because the issue at hand was a tax credit and not a government expenditure. Justice Scalia filed a concurring opinion, joined by Justice Thomas.

In her dissent, Justice Kagan said "cash grants and targeted tax breaks are means of accomplishing the same government objective—to provide financial support to select individuals or organizations." She further argued: "taxpayers should be able to challenge the subsidy." The dissent was joined by Justices Ginsburg, Breyer, and Sotomayor. Bruce Peabody, a political science professor at Fairleigh Dickinson University, remarked "the case brought out four dissents, a signal that those justices were prepared to decide the substantive issue." Equally, Peter Woolley, professor of political science and director of the PublicMind Poll, posited "in making this ruling on such narrow grounds, the court virtually guarantees that plaintiff in one guise or another will be back another day."

See also
List of United States Supreme Court cases, volume 563

References

Further reading

External links
 
 U.S. Supreme Court's coverage
 Oral argument transcripts and audio
 SCOTUSBlog coverage

2011 in United States case law
United States Constitution Article Three case law
Establishment Clause case law
United States Supreme Court cases
United States Supreme Court cases of the Roberts Court
Education in Arizona
Alliance Defending Freedom litigation